Kevin Warren Sumlin (born August 3, 1964) is an American football coach who is the associate head coach, co-offensive coordinator, and tight ends coach for the University of Maryland. Sumlin served as the head football coach at the University of Houston from 2008 to 2011, Texas A&M University from 2012 to 2017, and at the University of Arizona from 2018 to 2020.

Early life
Sumlin was born in Brewton, Alabama, on August 3, 1964. He later attended Brebeuf Jesuit Preparatory School in Indianapolis, where he played football, basketball, and ice hockey.

Following his prep career, Sumlin attended Purdue University and was a starting linebacker throughout his entire college career. He was a member of the 1984 Peach Bowl team and finished in the top 10 in total tackles with 375 (191 solo, 184 assisted) and in the top 20 in solo tackles with 191. He led the team in tackles during his freshman season of 1983 with 91 total tackles, (50 solo, 41 assisted). He was a teammate of players such as Jim Everett, Hall of Famer Rod Woodson, fellow linebacker Fred Strickland, and long-time NFL players Mel Gray and Cris Dishman.

Coaching career

Early years
Sumlin served as an assistant coach at Washington State, Wyoming, Minnesota, and Purdue (all, except for Minnesota, alongside Joe Tiller); served as assistant head coach at Texas A&M for two years under R.C. Slocum; and for five years at Oklahoma under Bob Stoops, serving the last two years as co-offensive coordinator. In addition to Stoops and Slocum, he has served as an assistant coach under Mike Price at Washington State and Joe Tiller at Purdue. While at Purdue,  offensive coordinator Jim Chaney and he aided Tiller in implementing the then-uncommonly used spread offense, and the Boilermakers, with Drew Brees as starting quarterback, broke a string of Big Ten passing records and made a surprise run to the 2001 Rose Bowl, Purdue's first Rose Bowl in three decades. He left for Texas A&M to serve as the offensive coordinator and assistant head coach for two seasons before joining the University of Oklahoma.

In his final year with the Oklahoma Sooners, Sumlin's offense was one of the best in the country, averaging 44 points per game.

Head coaching career
In December 2007, Sumlin was hired as the head coach of the University of Houston. In December 2009, Sumlin was announced as a finalist for the Paul "Bear" Bryant Award. In 2011, Sumlin coached Houston to a 12–0 start before losing the Conference USA Championship Game to the Southern Miss Golden Eagles.

On December 10, 2011, Sumlin told his players he was leaving Houston, effective immediately,  to accept a job at another school. KRIV in Houston and ESPN's Joe Schad both reported that Sumlin was to become the new coach at Texas A&M University. Special-teams coordinator Tony Levine coached Houston in the 2012 TicketCity Bowl.

In 2012, Sumlin named quarterback Johnny Manziel his starter. Manziel went on to win the Heisman Trophy and Sumlin took Texas A&M, in their first year in the Southeastern Conference, to an 11–2 record, including victories over then No. 1 Alabama in Tuscaloosa, and No. 11 Oklahoma in the AT&T Cotton Bowl. The Aggies finished the 2012 season ranked in the top five of both the Coaches Poll and the AP Poll for the first time since 1956. Texas A&M also led the SEC in total offense, total scoring offense, and total rushing yards, and led the nation in third down conversion percentage. Sumlin and the Aggies  became the first SEC team in history to amass over 7,000 yards in total offense. Coach Sumlin was the first head coach to win more than eight games in his first season as head coach.

On November 30, 2013, Sumlin agreed to a new six-year contract as head coach at Texas A&M. The contract, valued at $30 million over six years, was guaranteed. If Texas A&M had fired him after the 2015 and 2016 seasons, the buyout amounts ($20 million and $15 million, respectively) would have had to be paid out within 60 days of termination.

On November 21, 2017, news outlets reported that Sumlin would be fired following the 2017 season finale against LSU. On November 26, 2017, Sumlin was fired after six seasons. He compiled a 51–26 record during his tenure. Despite never posting a losing record as the coach of A&M, he only won more than nine games once, and only had one winning record in SEC play. Sumlin received a $10.4 million buyout under the terms of his contract, and was replaced by Jimbo Fisher for the 2018 season.

On January 14, 2018, Sumlin was hired as the University of Arizona's head coach. Sumlin suffered perhaps the worst defeat of his coaching career when his University of Arizona team lost to their traditional in-state rival Arizona State on December 11, 2020,  by a score of 70–7. The following day, Sumlin was fired.

On January 6, 2022, Sumlin was named the head coach and general manager for the Houston Gamblers of the United States Football League. Sumlin's Gamblers finished 3-7 in his lone season and did not qualify for the postseason.

Return to college coaching 
On February 14, 2023, Sumlin was hired as the University of Maryland's associate head coach, co-offensive coordinator, and tight ends coach.

Head coaching record

College

USFL

Notes

References

External links

 Arizona profile

1964 births
Living people
African-American coaches of American football
African-American players of American football
American football linebackers
Arizona Wildcats football coaches
Coaches of American football from Alabama
Coaches of American football from Indiana
Houston Cougars football coaches
Minnesota Golden Gophers football coaches
Oklahoma Sooners football coaches
People from Brewton, Alabama
Players of American football from Alabama
Players of American football from Indiana
Purdue Boilermakers football coaches
Purdue Boilermakers football players
Texas A&M Aggies football coaches
Washington State Cougars football coaches
Wyoming Cowboys football coaches
Houston Gamblers (2022) coaches